Iraj Khorshidfar is an Iranian former Greco-Roman wrestler. He won a bronze medal at the 1966 World Championships in Toledo, Ohio.

References

Iranian male sport wrestlers
World Wrestling Championships medalists
Living people
People from Ray, Iran
Year of birth missing (living people)
20th-century Iranian people